Procambarus pogum, the bearded crayfish or bearded red crayfish, is a species of crayfish in the family Cambaridae. It is endemic to the Houlka–Tibbie Creek basin in Chickasaw County and Oktibbeha County, Mississippi, and is listed as Data Deficient on the IUCN Red List, having only been recorded once since its original description.

References

External links

Cambaridae
Freshwater crustaceans of North America
Natural history of Mississippi
Taxonomy articles created by Polbot
Crustaceans described in 1978
Taxa named by Joseph F. Fitzpatrick Jr.